The Nikon Coolpix 5700 is a 2002 bridge digital camera manufactured and distributed by Nikon, succeeded by the Coolpix 8700, now both discontinued.

A large zoom lens, a magnesium body, and other features make the 5700 unusual for a bridge camera, and it is very different from the later Coolpix cameras. Despite the solid construction, these cameras suffer from unprovoked sensor failure, a common problem for which Nikon has issued a service advisory. This was the last of the Nikon Coolpix series to use the CYGM colour filter. The camera is capable of RAW output with 12-bits of precision.

External links
Review from August 2002

5700
Cameras introduced in 2002